Julius Caesar is a 2003 miniseries about the life of Julius Caesar. It was directed by Uli Edel and written by Peter Pruce and Craig Warner. It is a dramatization of the life of Julius Caesar from 82 BC to his death in 44 BC. It was one of the last two films of Richard Harris, released in the year of his death. The series was originally broadcast on TNT in two parts, airing June 29 and 30, 2003. The tagline for the miniseries was His Time Has Come. The miniseries was nominated for 2 Emmys.

Plot
The series begins in 82 BC when Julius Caesar is 18 years old. He is out in the town with his daughter Julia (who in real history was not yet born) when news comes that Lucius Cornelius Sulla is just outside the city walls and intends to take the city with his army. The guards sent with the news post death lists on the senate door. When he sees his father-in-law's name he rushes to his house to try to help him escape. Pompey arrests him and takes him to Sulla. Caesar's mother, Aurelia, asks Sulla to show him mercy; out of respect for her, he promises to let Caesar live if he divorces his wife, Cornelia but Caesar refuses. Sulla lets him go but orders Pompey to kill him and bring his heart to him. Pompey follows Caesar and tells him to leave Rome, which he does. Pompey buys a swine's heart from the market and tells Sulla that the heart is Caesar's.

Caesar is captured by pirates who intend to ransom him for money. When the Romans crew sent with the message of the ransom don't return, the pirates plan to kill him. Caesar bargains to fight one of them for an extra day and wins, then has a seizure and the pirates believe him worthless, deciding to throw him in the sea; just in time the Roman boat returns with the money and they let Caesar go. Back in Rome, Sulla dies of a heart-attack and Caesar is allowed to return home. While he was gone Cornelia became very ill and Julia befriended the young daughter of Caesar's rival Marcus Porcius Cato, Portia, her brother Marcus and their cousin Brutus.

When Cornelia dies from her illness, Caesar swears at her funeral that he will make Rome a better place. Around this time the same pirates who held him captive cut off the grain supply. The senate send Pompey to deal with the problem after Caesar convinced them that he will not take the city with his army like Sulla did. Several years later Pompey returns to Rome and Caesar has achieved the consulship. On the day of Pompey's triumph Julia, Portia and Marcus decide to go and Portia insists on dragging Brutus along with them. At the triumph, Caesar has another seizure but is aided by Calpurnia, daughter of a wealthy man in Rome. At Pompey's welcome home party, while Pompey gets on well with Julia, Caesar notices Calpurnia who he doesn't remember from their encounter before.

Caesar swears to his mother that he will make a name for himself. Julia realizes that her father needs an alliance and offers to marry Pompey in order to obtain his legions. Pompey agrees and he marries Julia. In marrying her, he agrees to allow Caesar to take his legions to Gaul, despite the fact that the senate wished to send Cassius. Calpurnia tells Caesar that she knows about his "falling sickness" and he confesses that it shames him. Before he goes to Gaul, Caesar marries Calpurnia and the two of them remain in contact through letters.

While sacking a town in Gaul, Caesar comes across a strong-willed warrior who refuses to give in to the Romans attacking his home. He tells Caesar his name is Vercingetorix. Caesar asks him why he is willing to die for something that will be destroyed no matter what, and the warrior replies "because it is mine".  Admiring his strength of will, Caesar lets him go, giving him a horse. However, later on, the same warrior chief summons a huge army to fight Caesar's legions at the Battle of Alesia. Outnumbered and surrounded, Caesar's army nevertheless emerges victorious.

Meanwhile, in Rome Julia dies in childbirth, and Pompey begins to turn against Caesar who he fears is becoming too powerful. He allies with Cato to attack Caesar politically. Caesar sends Mark Antony to talk to the Senate, but this makes the situation worse. Pompey begins planning to attack Caesar before he can march to Rome, but is too late. Caesar makes his way back to Rome and crosses the river Rubicon with his army.

Pompey, Cato and Brutus immediately decide to leave to regroup their own troops in Greece. Upon his return to Rome Caesar is made dictator. He then catches up with and defeats Pompey at the Battle of Pharsalus, who then flees to Egypt. After the battle Caesar pardons the captured soldiers of Pompey, including Brutus to whom he says that if anyone wants peace they shall have it. Pompey arrives in Alexandria and is immediately killed by the regent for the boy king Ptolemy XIII in Egypt. When Caesar arrives he is given Pompey's head as a gift but is not pleased to know of Pompey's death. Then Cleopatra VII meets and seduces Caesar, and before he leaves he installs her as rightful Queen of Egypt over her brother Ptolemy. Going on to Utica to find Cato and his son, Caesar wins the Battle of Thapsus. Upon hearing of his allies' loss Cato, who didn't fight in the battle, commits suicide by falling on his sword.

With the Civil War over, Caesar returns to Rome with his new ally Cleopatra and their son Caesarion. This disturbs several of the senators, who plot against Caesar thinking he wants to become King. Cassius, the principal mover of the plot, convinces his brother-in-law Brutus, who was spared earlier by Caesar, to join them and end Caesar's reign as Dictator. Calpurnia has a dream about Caesar's death and begs him not to attend the Senate that day but he ignores her advice. When he takes his seat on the Ides of March, the plotting senators mob Caesar, stab him several times and then flee from the building. Calpurnia learns of the plot from Brutus's wife Portia and rushes to the Senate to find him dying alone on the floor.

Cast 
 Jeremy Sisto as Julius Caesar, second Dictator for Life
 Richard Harris as Lucius Sulla, Rome's strongman who disliked Caesar but ultimately paved the way for his dictatorship
 Christopher Walken as Cato the Younger, ardent Republican who fought Caesar in the Senate and the battlefield
 Valeria Golino as Calpurnia, final wife of Julius Caesar
 Christopher Noth as Pompey the Great, Rome's greatest General outdone by Caesar
  as Aurelia, Caesar's mother
 Heino Ferch as Vercingetorix, Chief of the Arverni tribe of the Gauls who tried to stop Caesar's Gallic War
 Tobias Moretti as Gaius Cassius, led Pompey's fleet in Caesar's Civil War and prime plotter of Caesar's murder
  as Cleopatra, Queen of Egypt and lover of Caesar
  as Cornelia, wife of Caesar and mother of Julia
 Nicole Grimaudo as Julia, daughter of Caesar, wife of Pompey and dies after her son is born
 Sean Pertwee as Titus Labienus, a lieutenant under Caesar; he defected to Pompey once he knew Caesar was marching on Rome and died in the Battle of Munda, the last battle of the war
 Paolo Briguglia as Marcus Cato, son of Cato
 Kate Steavenson-Payne as Portia, wife of Brutus
 Ian Duncan as Brutus, Senator and friend of Caesar who is the most famous for turning on Caesar and participating in his murder
 Jay Rodan as Mark Antony, a cousin, friend, and military commander of Caesar who would eventually get revenge on Caesar's murderers
 Christian Kohlund as Lepidus, Caesar's best supporter in the Senate who allied with Mark Antony after his murder
 David Foxxe as Pothinus, regent of King Ptolemy XIII
 Anna Cachia as Atilia, wife of Cato and mother of Marcus Cato
 Christopher Ettridge as Apollonius Molon, Greek philosopher and teacher
 Colin Maher as Casca, Senator who was actually the first man to stab Caesar
 Brendan Hooper as Bibulus, son in-law to Cato who fought against Caesar in the war
 John Suda as Tillius, Senator and assassin of Caesar
 Chris Gatt as Ligarius, Senator and conspirator
 Clive Merrison as Metellus, Senator killed by Sulla as an example to the others
 Denys Hawthorne as Spurinna, soothsayer who warned Caesar of the Ides of March
 Manuel Cuachi as Cinna, Caesar's father-in-law, anachronistically killed in Sulla's purge (the real Cinna was murdered by his own soldiers before Sulla's return)

Production
Filming took place in Malta and Bulgaria.

Home media
The miniseries was released on DVD in 2004 in the United States and in 2005 in the United Kingdom. The DVD contains a making-of featurette.

See also
 List of historical drama films
 List of films set in ancient Rome
 1st century BC
 First Triumvirate
 Gallic Wars
 Caesar's Civil War

References

External links 
 

2000s American television miniseries
American biographical series
Films directed by Uli Edel
Films set in ancient Rome
Films set in the 1st century BC
Films set in Alexandria
Films set in Asia
Films set in Pisa
Films set in Rome
Films set in Tunisia
Films shot in Bulgaria
Films shot in Malta
Depictions of Julius Caesar on television
Depictions of Cleopatra on television
Depictions of Mark Antony on television
Cultural depictions of Marcus Junius Brutus
Cultural depictions of Vercingetorix
Cultural depictions of Pompey
Cultural depictions of Sulla